Andrew Mark Beane (born 9 November 1972) has been Archdeacon of Exeter since September 2019.

Beane was educated at St John's College, Nottingham and ordained in 2003. After a curacy at Thorpe St Andrew he held incumbencies at Horsham St Faith and then Aylsham until his appointment as Archdeacon.

References

1972 births
Living people
21st-century English Anglican priests
Alumni of St John's College, Nottingham
Archdeacons of Exeter